Duffws railway station may refer to:
 Duffws railway station (Festiniog Railway)
 Duffws railway station (Festiniog and Blaenau Railway)